Lieutenant General Gustaf Peder Wilhelm Dyrssen (24 November 1891 – 13 May 1981) was a Swedish Army officer and Olympic modern pentathlete.

Early life
Dyrssen was born on 24 November 1891 in Stockholm, Sweden, the son of admiral Wilhelm Dyrssen and baroness Lizinka af Uggla. His brother, Magnus Dyrssen, became lieutenant colonel and served in Finland during the Winter War where he was killed in action.

Career

Military career
He was commissioned into the Svea Artillery Regiment (A 1) as a second lieutenant in 1912 and attended at the Artillery and Engineering College from 1914 to 1915. Dyrssen became a lieutenant in 1915 and attended at the Royal Swedish Army Staff College from 1917 to 1919. He was a cadet in the General Staff from 1920 to 1922, became captain in 1924 and served at the State Railways from 1924 to 1926. Dyrssen was a teacher at the Artillery and Engineering College from 1926 to 1932, captain in the Svea Artillery Regiment from 1930 to 1932, captain in the General Staff in 1932 and served as bureau chief at the Railway Board (Järnvägsstyrelsen) from 1932 to 1937.

He was appointed to major in 1934 and was the first adjutant and lieutenant colonel in the General Staff in 1937. Dyrssen was head of the Communications Department of the Defence Staff from 1937 to 1939 and lieutenant colonel and commander of the Gotland Artillery Corps (A 7) in 1939. Dyrssen was appointed colonel in 1940 and was commander of the Svea Artillery Regiment from 1941 to 1942, the commandant of the Boden Fortress as well as the deputy military commander of the VI Military District from 1942 to 1945. He was appointed major general in 1944 and was the military commander of the IV Military District and the Commandant General in Stockholm from 1945 to 1957. He retired from the Army in 1957 and was appointed lieutenant general in the reserve.

Athletic career
Dyrssen won the eventing contest at the 1916 Swedish Games. In the modern pentathlon he won a gold medal at the 1920 and a silver medal at the 1924 Summer Olympics. He competed in the individual and team épée at the 1924, 1928 and 1936 Olympics and won a team silver medal in 1936. He won seven medals in the épée at the world championships of 1931–1938, as well as three national titles, in 1927, 1932 and 1952, aged 60. Dyrssen won the modern pentathlon at the Nordiska Idrætslege in Copenhagen in 1921, the patrol competition on skis at the 1922 Nordic Games and the Swedish Championship in modern pentathlon in 1922.

Dyrssen was a prominent sports administrator, serving as president of the Swedish Fencing Federation (1936–1940), president of the International Modern Pentathlon Union (IUPM, 1949–1960), and a member of the International Olympic Committee (1952–1970), among other posts.

Other work
Dyrssen was chairman of the Railway Preparedness Investigation from 1935 to 1937, the Inter-Scandinavian Transit Committee in 1939 and the 1945 Military Investigation from 1945 to 1946. He became a member of the Swedish Olympic Committee in 1946 and was chairman of the Swedish Central Association for Sports Promotion (Sveriges centralförening för idrottens främjande) from 1947 to 1961, the Swedish Fencing Federation from 1936 to 1940, the Union Internationale de Pentathlon Moderne and the Biathlon Association from 1949 to 1960. Dyrssen was a member of the International Olympic Committee from 1952 to 1970 and of the Royal Swedish Academy of War Sciences in 1936. He was CEO of the Society for the Promotion of Ski Sport and Open Air Life (Skid- och friluftsfrämjandet) from 1958 to 1962 and chairman of Uppsala County Hunting Association (Uppsala läns jaktvårdsförening).

Personal life
Dyrssen was married from 1915 to 1953 to Maia Wennerholm (1894–1980), daughter of colonel Malcolm Wennerholm and Elsa Broman. He married a second time in 1953 to Eva Hallin (1910–2007), daughter of the chamberlain Axel Hallin and Helga Kreuger. He was the father of David (born 1922), Gerry (born 1923), Marika (born 1935), Thérese (born 1936) and Wilhelm (born 1938).

Dates of rank
1912 – Underlöjtnant
1915 – Lieutenant
1924 – Captain
1934 – Major
1937 – Lieutenant colonel
1940 – Colonel
1944 – Major general
1957 – Lieutenant general

Awards and decorations

Swedish
   King Gustaf V's Jubilee Commemorative Medal (1948)
   Commander Grand Cross of the Order of the Sword (6 June 1951)
   Knight of the Order of the Polar Star
   Knight of the Order of Vasa
  Swedish Fencing Federation Honorary Shield (Svenska fäktförbundets hederssköld) (1940)
  Sport badge in gold
  Sweden's Military Sports Federation's gold medal with wreath

Foreign
   Grand Cross of the Order of the Lion of Finland
   Grand Cross of the Order of St. Olav (1 July 1953)
   Grand Officer of the Order of Merit
   Commander 1st Class of the Order of the Dannebrog
   Honorary Knight Commander of the Royal Victorian Order (June 1956)
   Commander of the Order of Orange-Nassau with swords
   Commander of the Order of the German Eagle

References

External links
 
 

1891 births
1981 deaths
Swedish Army lieutenant generals
Swedish male modern pentathletes
Swedish male épée fencers
Olympic modern pentathletes of Sweden
Olympic fencers of Sweden
Modern pentathletes at the 1920 Summer Olympics
Modern pentathletes at the 1924 Summer Olympics
Fencers at the 1924 Summer Olympics
Fencers at the 1928 Summer Olympics
Fencers at the 1936 Summer Olympics
Olympic gold medalists for Sweden
Olympic silver medalists for Sweden
Olympic medalists in fencing
Olympic medalists in modern pentathlon
International Olympic Committee members
Medalists at the 1920 Summer Olympics
Medalists at the 1924 Summer Olympics
Medalists at the 1936 Summer Olympics
Members of the Royal Swedish Academy of War Sciences
Commanders Grand Cross of the Order of the Sword
Knights of the Order of the Polar Star
Recipients of the Order of Vasa
Commanders First Class of the Order of the Dannebrog
Commanders of the Royal Victorian Order
Commanders of the Order of Orange-Nassau
Military personnel from Stockholm